In Greek mythology, Aesepus (Ancient Greek: Αἴσηπος) may refer to:

Aesepus, one of the Potamoi, river-god sons of the Titans Oceanus and his sister-wife Tethys. He was the divine personification of the river and nearby town of Aesepus (today known as Gönen in Turkey). Aesepus was the grandfather of the other Aesepus through his daughter Abarbarea. His other daughter Phrygia was the eponym of the country Phrygia.
Aesepus, the son of the naiad Abarbarea (daughter of the above Aesepus) and Bucolion. His twin brother was Pedasus; the pair appears briefly in the Iliad, Book VI.  Both men fought in the Trojan War and were killed by Euryalus, the son of Mecisteus.

Notes

References 

 Hesiod, Theogony from The Homeric Hymns and Homerica with an English Translation by Hugh G. Evelyn-White, Cambridge, MA.,Harvard University Press; London, William Heinemann Ltd. 1914. Online version at the Perseus Digital Library. Greek text available from the same website.
 Homer, The Iliad with an English Translation by A.T. Murray, Ph.D. in two volumes. Cambridge, MA., Harvard University Press; London, William Heinemann, Ltd. 1924. . Online version at the Perseus Digital Library.
Homer, Homeri Opera in five volumes. Oxford, Oxford University Press. 1920. . Greek text available at the Perseus Digital Library.
 Maurus Servius Honoratus, In Vergilii carmina comentarii. Servii Grammatici qui feruntur in Vergilii carmina commentarii; recensuerunt Georgius Thilo et Hermannus Hagen. Georgius Thilo. Leipzig. B. G. Teubner. 1881. Online version at the Perseus Digital Library.
 Quintus Smyrnaeus, The Fall of Troy translated by Way. A. S. Loeb Classical Library Volume 19. London: William Heinemann, 1913. Online version at theio.com
 Quintus Smyrnaeus, The Fall of Troy. Arthur S. Way. London: William Heinemann; New York: G.P. Putnam's Sons. 1913. Greek text available at the Perseus Digital Library.

Potamoi
Trojans